The Microthyriaceae are a family of fungi with an uncertain taxonomic placement in the class Dothideomycetes.

List of Genera 
The following genera are included within the Microthyriaceae, according to the 2007 Outline of Ascomycota there were 49 genera. The placement of genera with a question mark preceding their name is uncertain.

Actinomyxa —

Arnaudiella —
Asterinella —
Asterinema —
Asteritea —
Asteronia —
Byssopeltis —
Calothyriopsis —
Caribaeomyces —
Caudella —
Cirsosina —
Cirsosiopsis —
Cyclotheca —
Dictyoasterina —
Govindua —
Helminthopeltis —
Hidakaea —
Hugueninia —
Lembosiella —
Lichenopeltella —
Maublancia —
Microthyrium —

Pachythyrium —
Palawania —
Petrakiopeltis —
Phaeothyriolum —
Phragmaspidium —
Platypeltella —
Polycyclinopsis —
Polystomellina —
Resendea —
Sapucchaka —
Scolecopeltidium —
Seynesiella —
Seynesiola - 
Seynesiopeltis —
Stegothyrium —
Tothia —
Trichopeltella —

Trichopeltospora —
Trichopeltum —
Trichothyriella —
Trichothyrinula —
Trichothyriomyces —

Xenostomella

References

External links
Index Fungorum

Microthyriales
Dothideomycetes families
Taxa named by Pier Andrea Saccardo